Mo'Hits Records (popularly called Mo'Hits) was a Nigeria-based music record label owned by D'banj and Don Jazzy. According to Nigeria's Corporate Affairs Commission (CAC), Mo'Hits Records Limited was founded in 2006, signing D'banj as its first recording artist. Don Jazzy was the CEO/President of the label and D'banj was the Co-Owner. The label went on to sign other artists including Wande Coal, Dr SID, D'Prince and K-Switch. The label specialised in Afrobeat.

The first album released by the label was D'banj's No Long Thing in 2005. Other albums are Rundown & The Entertainer (D'banj), Mushin2Mohits (Wande Coal) & Turning Point (Dr SID). The label has also released a compilation album called Mo'Hits All Stars. Don Jazzy has won various accolades including Nigeria Music Awards (NMA) Producer of the Year in 2006, and Nigeria Entertainment Awards Music Producer of the Year in 2007.

The label has also attracted foreign interest from international acts like Kanye West and Jay-Z and D'banj got signed to Kanye's GOOD Music.

The label is no longer in operation as Don Jazzy moved on to open Mavins Record Label and Dbanj started up DB record label.

End 
In March 2012, Don Jazzy confirmed using his Twitter account to announce that D'banj had left the group. D'Banj's reason for leaving was cited as difference in interests.

Don Jazzy went on to establish another record label known as Mavin Records.

Post separation 

After separation, Mo'hits artistes performed together for the first time on 27 December 2017 in the Davido show tagged "30Billion Concert".

Artists

Discography

References 

Nigerian record labels
Record labels established in 2004